The Capture of Peshawar took place in spring of 1758 when Maratha Empire in alliance with the Sikhs, defeated the Durrani Empire. The Marathas and the Sikhs were victorious in battle and Peshawar was captured thereafter. Before that, the fort of Peshawar was being guarded by Durrani troops under Timur Shah Durrani and Jahan Khan. When Raghunathrao, Malhar Rao Holkar and Sikh alliance of Charat Singh and Jassa Singh Ahluwalia left Peshawar, Tukoji Rao Holkar was appointed as the representative in this area of the sub-continent. Tukoji Rao Holkar along with Sardar Santajirao Wable and Khandoji Kadam defeated the Afghan garrison.

Aftermath
Peshawar was captured on 8 May 1758 by the Maratha Empire, in alliance with the Sikhs, from the Durrani Empire. The Marathas and Sikhs were victorious in the campaign in the province and Peshawar was captured. After being defeated by the army of Marathas and Sikhs, Durranis with Jahan Khan and Timur Shah Durrani left the fort and fled to Afghanistan meanwhile Marathas captured and took control of the fort. The Marathas' victory extended their rule  to the Afghani border, about 2000 km from Pune.

See also 
Battle of Delhi (1757)
Third Battle of Panipat

References

Further reading
 
 Duff, James Grant. [ A history of the Mahrattas, Volume 2]
 

Battles involving the Maratha Empire
Battles involving the Durrani Empire
1758 Battle of Peshawar
Conflicts in 1758
1758 in Asia
1750s in the Durrani Empire